RMS Republic was a steam-powered ocean liner built in 1903 by Harland and Wolff in Belfast, and lost at sea in a collision in 1909 while sailing for the White Star Line.  The ship was equipped with a new Marconi wireless telegraphy transmitter, and issued a CQD distress call, resulting in the saving of around 1,500 lives. Known as the "Millionaires' Ship" because of the number of wealthy Americans who traveled by her, she was described as a "palatial liner" and was the flagship of White Star Line's Boston service. This was the first important marine rescue made possible by radio, and brought worldwide attention to this new technology.

History

White Star acquisition
The ship was originally built in Belfast, Ireland for the International Mercantile Marine's Dominion Line (a sister company to the White Star Line) and was named . She was launched on 26 February 1903 and made her maiden voyage in October 1903 from Liverpool to Boston. Columbus was renamed Republic, the second ship under White Star livery to hold the name (White Star's original  of 1872 had been sold to the Holland America Line in 1889 and renamed Maasdam), while her three fellow former Dominion liners were renamed Romanic, Canopic and Cretic respectively.

Career

Republic made her first crossing under White Star from Liverpool to Boston on 17 December 1903, arriving in Boston 27 December. In January 1903, she made her first crossing from Boston to the Mediterranean via Gibraltar, making calls at Sao Miguel in the Azores, followed by the Italian ports of Naples and Genoa, and ending at Alexandria, a voyage which often took up to three weeks to complete one-way.

In November 1904, she inaugurated White Star's Mediterranean–New York service. White Star intended this route for two purposes: first, they sought to establish a market for cruising opportunities for wealthy American passengers, as her spacious and luxurious accommodations in first and second class attracted scores of wealthy vacationers, thus earning her the nickname "The Millionaires' Ship". Second, and more predominantly on her westbound crossings, White Star sought to tap into the massive Italian immigrant trade. Republic, with a third class capacity of 2,000, proved to be immensely profitable on this route, as when she sailed for the United States on any given trip, third class was often booked to capacity, and sometimes beyond. A vast majority of Italian immigrants who sailed by White Star boarded Republic and the other ships at Naples, along with smaller groups of Greeks, Austrians, Slavs, Turks and Syrians. White Star's placement of Sao Miguel on their Mediterranean services opened them up to traffic from Portuguese immigrants as well.

Over the next four years, Republic spent the winter and spring months running on White Star's Mediterranean–New York service alongside the Cretic, while during the summer and fall months she sailed on the Liverpool–Boston route together with Cymric and Arabic.

Collision with SS Florida

In early morning of 23 January 1909, while sailing from New York City to Gibraltar and Mediterranean ports with 742 passengers and crew and Captain Inman Sealby (1862–1942) in command, Republic entered a thick fog off the island of Nantucket, Massachusetts. Amongst the passengers were plenty of illustrious people such as James Ross Mellon, his wife Rachel Hughey Larimer Mellon, their daughter Sarah of the Mellon banking family and family maid, Mrs. Sophie Mansfield Curtis, wife of George Munson Curtis (treasurer of the International Silver Company), Mrs. Mary Harriman Severance, wife of Cordenio A. Severance, Professor John M. Coulter with wife and children, General Brayton Ives, St. Louis millionaire Samuel Cupples, historian Alice Morse Earle, and Mildred Montague, Countess Pasolini.  Travelling in first class were also Mr. Leonard L. McMurray, who, in 1915, would survive the sinking of the Cunard liner , and Mrs. Bessie Armstead Davis, daughter-in-law of senator Henry G. Davis of West Virginia with two children.

Taking standard precautions and maintaining her speed, the steamer regularly signaled her presence in the outbound shipping traffic lane by whistle. At 5:47 a.m., another whistle was heard and Republics engines were ordered to full reverse, and the helm put "hard-a-port". Out of the fog, the Lloyd Italiano liner SS Florida appeared and hit Republic amidships on her portside, at about a right angle. Two passengers asleep in their cabins on Republic were killed when Floridas bow sliced into her, liquor wholesale manager Eugene Lynch's wife Mary and banker William J. Mooney. Eugene Lynch was critically injured and died as a result of his injuries at Long Island College Hospital, Brooklyn, 26 January. On Florida, three crewmen were also killed when the bow was crushed back to a collision bulkhead. Six people died in total.

The engine and boiler rooms on Republic began to flood, and the ship listed. Captain Sealby led the crew in calmly organizing the passengers on deck for evacuation. Republic was equipped with the new Marconi wireless telegraph system, and became the first ship in history to issue a CQD distress signal, sent by John R. Binns. Florida came about to rescue Republics complement, and the U.S. Revenue Cutter Service cutter  responded to the distress signal as well. Passengers were distributed between the two ships, with Florida taking the bulk of them, but with 900 Italian immigrants already on board, this left the ship dangerously overloaded.

The White Star liner , commanded by Captain J. B. Ranson, also responded to the CQD call, but due to the persistent fog, it was not until the evening that Baltic was able to locate the drifting Republic. Once on-scene, the rescued passengers were transferred from Gresham and Florida to Baltic. Because of the damage to Florida, that ship's immigrant passengers were also transferred to Baltic, but a riot nearly broke out when they had to wait until first-class Republic passengers were transferred. Once everyone was on board, Baltic sailed for New York.

At the time of Republics sinking, ocean liners were not required to have a full capacity of lifeboats for their passengers, officers and crew. It was believed that on the busy North Atlantic route, assistance from at least one ship would be ever-present and that lifeboats would be needed only to ferry all aboard to their rescue vessels and back until everyone was safely evacuated. That scenario, unlike during the RMS Titanic sinking, played out flawlessly during the ship's sinking, and the six people who died were lost in the collision, not the sinking itself.

Captain Sealby and a skeleton crew remained on board Republic to make an effort to save her. Crewmen from the Gresham tried using collision mats to stem the flooding but to no avail. On 24 January, Republic sank stern first; at 15,378 tons, she was the largest ship to have sunk until then. All the remaining crew were evacuated before she sank.

Reported cargoes

There are many reports that Republic was carrying gold and other valuables when she sank. One report is that she was carrying gold worth $250,000  in American gold coins to be used as payroll for the US Navy's Great White Fleet.

In addition to the US Navy coin-monies shipment, various sources reported  on a much larger cargo, $3,000,000 in US gold Double Eagles. Among these, The Washington Post reported, "Three million dollars in gold coins lies in the rotting hulk of the White Star liner Republic, lost off Nantucket in January, 1909. The Republic, damaged in a collision, was being towed toward New York by the Coast Guard cutter Gresham, when she sank in 240 feet of water. A salvage attempt in 1919 was unsuccessful." And again one year later, "In 1909 the [White] Star Liner Republic was damaged in a collision. While being towed to safety she sank in over 200 feet of water. At the present all attempts to salvage the $3,000,000 in her holds have been unsuccessful." The New York Times reported, "The White Star Liner Republic, lost off Nantucket Shoals in 1909, carried $3,000,000 in gold eagles. However, the Republic rests in 185 [270] feet of water."

All of these  values are in 1909 dollars. $3 million USD  in 1909 is equivalent to approximately $100 million USD in 2023, after adjusting for inflation. One coin expert appraised the value of RMS Republic'''s cargoes today would exceed $1 billion.

 Rediscovery 
The wreck of Republic was found by Captain Martin Bayerle in 1981.

See also
 RMS Empress of Ireland, which also sank as a result of a collision
 Treasure hunting (marine)

References

External links
 Historical News Coverage of the Sinking of the RMS Republic
 The Hero of the Republic
 "CQD" by Alfred M. Caddell, Radio Broadcast, April 1924, pages 449-455. 
 "The Triumph of  Wireless", The Outlook'', 6 February 1909, pages 294-297.
 The American Experience |Rescue at Sea
 R. M. S. Republic | Samuel Cupples House
 Billions in gold? Former dive shop owner to salvage RMS Republic
 RMS Republic - Sad Times for Older Sister of Titanic
 Details of Baltic's effort to find Republic

Shipwrecks of the Massachusetts coast
Steamships
Ships built in Belfast
Ships of the White Star Line
Ships of the Dominion Line
Maritime incidents in 1909
1903 ships
Ships sunk in collisions
Ships built by Harland and Wolff
Treasure from shipwrecks